Propetandrol (brand name Solevar; former developmental code name SC-7294), or propethandrol, also known as 17α-ethyl-19-nortestosterone 3β-propionate or 17α-ethyl-19-nor-4-androstenediol 3β-propionate, as well as 17α-ethylestr-4-en-3β,17β-diol 3β-propionate, is a synthetic and orally active anabolic–androgenic steroid (AAS) and progestogen and a 17α-alkylated derivative of 19-nortestosterone. It is an androgen ester – specifically, the 3β-propionate ester of norethandrolone (17α-ethyl-19-nortestosterone).

See also
 Bolandiol
 Bolenol
 Methandriol
 Penmesterol

References

Androgen esters
Androgens and anabolic steroids
Estranes
Hepatotoxins
Prodrugs
Progestogens
Propionate esters